HNLMS Drenthe (D816) was a destroyer of the . The ship was in service with the Royal Netherlands Navy from 1956 to 1980. The destroyer was named after the Dutch province of Drenthe and was the fourth ship with this name. In 1980 the ship was taken out of service and sold to Peru where it was  renamed Guise. The ship's radio call sign was "PALZ".

Dutch service history
HNLMS Drenthe was one of eight s and was built at the NDSM in Amsterdam. The keel laying took place on 9 January 1954 and the launching on 26 March 1955. The ship was put into service on 1 August 1957.

A fire broke out in the engine room on 12 November 1980 during the last journey the ship made. Two crewman died during the fire and four were injured. The fire was caused by an attempt to burn paper in the engine room. That day Drenthe was in the Caribbean to relieve  as station ship. The ship was however so damaged by the fire that the Rotterdam had to tow her to the harbor.

On 24 November 1980 the vessel was decommissioned and sold to the Peruvian Navy.

Peruvian service history
The ship was put into service on 3 June 1981 where the ship was renamed Guise and decommissioned in 1985.

Notes

Friesland-class destroyers
1955 ships
Ships built in Amsterdam
Destroyers of the Cold War